James Rooke or Rook may refer to:

 James Rooke (British Army general) (1742–1805), English general and politician
 James Rooke (British Legion officer) (1770–1819), British soldier in the Napoleonic wars
 James Rook (rowing) (born 1997), Australian rowing coxswain
 Nightmaster (James "Jim" Rook), a fictional character by DC Comics